The Sports Council Amsterdam (Dutch: Sportraad Amsterdam) is an independent advisory body  created by the city council in 1952. Its 1952 report "De Amsterdamse Sportbevolking" is reportedly the first sociological research report on sports in the Netherlands. Its reports are influential and its medal of honour is prestigious.

Sport Council Members

The Council has up to 18 members, elected by the municipal council of Amsterdam. Notable (former) members of the Council include:

 Frits Barend
 Marloes Coenen
 Uri Coronel
 Jessica Gal
 Kirsten van der Kolk
 Humberto Tan
 Cees Vervoorn

Activities

Reports 
The Council, supported by its Bureau, prepares reports on a wide array of issues related to sports in Amsterdam. Among the topics addressed in these reports are:

 Child exploitation in commercial soccer schools
 Physical education in primary schools

Medal of Honour 
Each year Sportraad honours a person or organization for its outstanding contribution to sports in Amsterdam by awarding a medal called Sportpenning. Among the laureates are:

 2010: Carolien Gehrels
 2015: The Flevopark swimming pool Association

External links 
  Official website Sportraad Amsterdam

References

Sport in Amsterdam
Government of Amsterdam